"If I Didn't Love You" is a song recorded by American country music singer-songwriters Jason Aldean and Carrie Underwood, released on July 23, 2021, as the first single from the first half of Macon on Aldean's tenth studio album Macon, Georgia, of which the first half, Macon was released on November 12, 2021. It was written by Tully Kennedy, John Morgan, Kurt Allison, and Lydia Vaughan.

Background
The song is a power ballad that describes both sides to a relationship having trouble moving on from the other. Kurt Allison and Tully Kennedy, two of the writers of the song, are members of Aldean's band and the production team New Voice Entertainment. The song came later in the album writing process, intended for a duet, with Aldean recording the song before picking out a duet partner. Aldean's list of singing partners was small, with Underwood being at the top.

Commercial performance
In the United States, "If I Didn't Love You" debuted at number 20 on the Billboard Country Airplay chart. The song also debuted at number two on the Hot Country Songs chart, becoming the highest debut for a duet between a solo male and female artist. It sold 29,500 downloads in its first week and drew 9 million streams during the tracking period and debuted at number 15 on the Billboard Hot 100 chart.
On the chart dated October 30, 2021, the song rose to number one on the Country Airplay chart, becoming Aldean's twenty-fourth number one single on that chart, and Underwood's sixteenth, as well as her first since "Church Bells" in July 2016. It extended Underwood's record as the female artist with the most number one hits on the Country Airplay chart. The song spent a second week at number one on the Mediabase/Country Aircheck Singles chart and Billboard’s Country Airplay chart. On the Country Airplay chart dated November 13, 2021, the song fell to No. 2, while Walker Hayes's "Fancy Like" replaced it at the top. The following week, it returned to No. 1 for a third and final week.

Accolades
The song received a nomination for Best Country Duo/Group Performance at the 64th Annual Grammy Awards. The song was nominated for three categories at the Academy for Country Music Awards 2022 for Musical Event of the Year, Video of The Year and Single of The Year, winning the latter.

Awards and nominations

57th Academy of Country Music Awards

|-
| style="text-align:center;"|2022|| style="text-align:center;"| "If I Didn't Love You" || style="text-align:center;"| Single of the Year|| 
|-
| style="text-align:center;"|2022|| style="text-align:center;"| "If I Didn't Love You" || style="text-align:center;"| Musical Event of the Year || 
|-
| style="text-align:center;"|2022|| style="text-align:center;"| "If I Didn't Love You" || style="text-align:center;"| Music Video of the Year||

2022 CMT Music Awards

|-
| style="text-align:center;"|2022|| style="text-align:center;"| "If I Didn't Love You" || style="text-align:center;"| Video of the Year|| 
|-
| style="text-align:center;"|2022|| style="text-align:center;"| "If I Didn't Love You" || style="text-align:center;"| Collaborative Video of the Year ||

64th Grammy Awards

|-
| style="text-align:center;"|2022|| style="text-align:center;"| "If I Didn't Love You" || style="text-align:center;"| Best Country/Duo Performance||

Music video
The lyric video was released on July 23, 2021, featuring Aldean and Underwood recording the song in the studio.
The official video premiered on September 8, 2021, and was directed by Shaun Silva. The video was filmed at Schermerhorn Symphony Center in Nashville, Tennessee. The music video scored two wins at the 2022 CMT Music Awards, for Video of the Year and Collaborative Video.

Live performances
Aldean and Underwood gave their first live performance of the song at the 55th Annual Country Music Association Awards at Nashville's Bridgestone Arena on November 10, 2021.  They also appeared at the American Music Awards of 2021 with a pre-taped performance.

Charts

Weekly charts

Year-end charts

Certifications

Release history

References

2020s ballads
2021 songs
2021 singles
Jason Aldean songs
Carrie Underwood songs
BBR Music Group singles
Capitol Records Nashville singles
Song recordings produced by Michael Knox (record producer)
Country ballads
Male–female vocal duets
Rock ballads